Whipple Lakes is a group of named lakes in Crow Wing County, in the U.S. state of Minnesota.

The group consists of Little Whipple Lake, Lower Whipple Lake, and Upper Whipple Lake. Whipple Lakes were named for Henry Benjamin Whipple, an Episcopal bishop noted for his work with Indians in the state.

See also
List of lakes in Minnesota

References

Lakes of Minnesota
Lakes of Crow Wing County, Minnesota